Tianjin No. 3 Middle School is located on Xiangdong Road in Hongqiao District of Tianjin, China.  The school was established in 1901 and is the oldest modern public middle school in Tianjin.  The school had various names over the years, including Bell Tower Middle School.  In 1982, UNDP and UNESCO provided the school with new equipment.

See also
 Gao Lingwen

External links
Official home page (in Chinese)

Education in Tianjin